A World of Pandemonium is the third full-length album released by The Hiatus on November 23, 2011. It reached No. 6 on the Oricon album chart.

Track listing

References 

2011 albums
The Hiatus albums